Novaliches Cathedral, canonically recognized as the Cathedral-Shrine and Parish of the Good Shepherd, is a Roman Catholic church located along Regalado Avenue in Barangay Fairview, Quezon City in the Philippines. It is the seat of the Diocese of Novaliches. It was established on August 5, 1975 by Manila Archbishop Jaime L. Cardinal Sin, who designated Rev. Fr. Fidelis Ruben Limcaco as the church's first parish priest.

From 1975 to 2003, the Good Shepherd Archdiocesan Shrine was a part of the Archdiocese of Manila. It was elevated into the status of cathedral when it was designated to be the seat of the newly created Diocese of Novaliches in January 2003. Rev. Msgr. Jesus-Romulo C. Rañada, PC became the first cathedral rector. Since 2019, Rev. Fr. Antonio E. Labiao Jr., VG has been the pastor and rector.

History 
The Catholic Community of Fairview in Quezon City started when a new subdivision, Fairview Park, was developed by the Regalado Family in the northern part of Quezon City in the early 70's. During that time, there was no daily mass in their community. It was still part of the Parish of Our Lady of Mount Carmel in Project 6, Quezon City and Sunday Mass was celebrated by a Dutch Carmelite Priest, Fr. Nico Hofstede, O.Carm in a motor pool owned by the Regalado Family.

The community in Fairview Park was then growing and it was the dream of the residents that a new parish be founded within the subdivision. On August 18, 1975, Jaime Cardinal Sin erected a new parish in Fairview Park. He appointed and installed on the same day Fr. Fidelis Ruben Limcaco as the first Parish Priest. Fr. Fidelis named the Parish as “The Good Shepherd Parish”. It had a wide area of jurisdiction; Tala & Bagong Silang (Caloocan) in the north; part of Novaliches in the west; Luzon Avenue in the south; and Marikina River in the east.

The Parish of the Good Shepherd was first housed in a small chapel at the crossroads of Fairview Avenue (now Commonwealth Avenue) and Regalado Avenue, loaned by the family of Mr. Bonifacio C. Regalado. As the community expanded, a need for a bigger church was imperative. This was the vision of Fr. Fidelis that he relentlessly pursued. The Regalado family donated a 3,650 square meter property at the corner of Regalado Avenue and Omega Street. Architect Raoul Sotto began to draw plans for a “Christopolos”: a church that would cater to the people’s needs. From there, a dream of a bigger church to honor Jesus emerged, the Good Shepherd was curved in the minds and hearts of Fr. Fidelis and the parishioners. It was a vision that would entail great sacrifices, commitment and dedication from the parishioners; a mission to be nurtured by time, talent and treasure from numerous parishioners. It was an undertaking that required leadership from the Parish Priest to the lay leaders.

On December 10, 1977, the Apostolic Nuncio to the Philippines, Archbishop Bruno Torpigliani led the celebrations during the monumental ground breaking ceremony and cornerstone laying. From that day, Fr. Fidelis vigorously pursued the construction. He made the parishioners realized that they have the responsibility as a member of the church. It is not enough that they go to church even daily. They have to share their time, talent and treasure. Simultaneous with the construction of the church, Fr. Fidelis developed the spirituality of the parishioners and devoted all his time teaching them to grow in a deeper understanding of the Holy Trinity. Such effort and dedication did not go unnoticed. On May 29, 1981, Pope John Paul II, through the recommendation of the archbishop, named Fr. Fidelis as Papal Chaplain. Hitherto he was lovingly called by all as “Monsi”.

For several years, the construction of the new church was the biggest challenge and most ambitious project of Msgr. Fidelis and the parishioners. There were many fund-raising affairs, social activities and solicitations that took place just to generate funds to continue the construction of the new church. These included “Gabi ng Harana”, “Dinner Dance”, “Raffles”, “Bingo Social”, and “Alay Envelop”. The biggest source of funds was the “Miss Good Shepherd Parish” and “Santa Elena Contests”. The new church was blessed, consecrated and dedicated to Jesus the Good Shepherd by Cardinal Sin, Archbishop of Manila on August 19, 1984. Also on that day, three distinguished parishioners, Inocencio F. Fallaria, Ismael D. Quiambao and Rene R. Isidoro, were awarded the title of “Papal Knights of the Pontifical Order of St. Sylvester” by the Papal Nuncio Archbishop Bruno Torpigliani.

The ever-dynamic Msgr. Fidelis, did not end his vision and mission in the construction of the church building. The formation of a true church, nurtured with spiritual teachings was his final goal. But temporal facilities were needed to house these programs. It was at that time, the lot near the creek consisting of 1,635 square meters more or less was purchased from the Rural Bank of Tagaytay. After that, the lot where the Parish Center and Retreat House was constructed, consisting of more than 2,000 square meters was claimed from the government. And then the lot at the back of the church consisting of 5,000 square meters was purchased from the United Coconut Planters Bank. The total land area of the church premises is more than 1.2 hectares. From these properties, a Parish Center and Retreat House which is named after Msgr. Fidelis was also constructed. This serves as a venue for the various seminars and activities of the parish for its continuous programs of spiritual renewal. Other edifices were built through the unending effort and sacrifices of the parishioners and countless generous benefactors outside the parish. Likewise, within the said area, four pavilions, a school house, a beautiful Adoration Chapel, a covered basketball court (now called the Parish Gym), Ascension Chapel, a swimming pool and other various buildings for the occupancy of church workers, were constructed. What makes the church premises more beautiful are the ecological garden surrounded by trees and ornamental plants which delight pilgrims and visitors alike. The church was proclaimed the Archdiocesan Shrine of the Good Shepherd on April 28, 1985.

On April 28, 1985, the parish was elevated into an archdiocesan shrine. Msgr. Limcaco retired in 2002 and Msgr. Jesus-Romulo Rañada, rector of San Carlos Seminary, was appointed by Cardinal Sin to become the second rector of the shrine. Msgr. Rañada was installed in August 2002.

Pope John Paul II decreed the establishment of a new local church that would comprise the northern area of Quezon City and north Caloocan. This gave birth to the Diocese of Novaliches, which was inaugurated on January 16, 2003. Most Rev. Teodoro Bacani, Jr., was appointed first bishop. Msgr. Rañada became the first rector of the cathedral. The Good Shepherd Archdiocesan Shrine was renamed the Cathedral Shrine and Parish of the Good Shepherd, or shortly, the Cathedral of Novaliches.

The church itself is an architectural landmark in the area, with a striking facade consisting of tubular structures joined together to form a roof. The Ascension Chapel is to the left of the altar and is usually used for wakes and necrological services. A basement area is used for Parish Renewal Experience meetings and also holds choir records. The altar area was expanded and renovated in 2007 and features art-deco ornamentation, a first in the Philippines. The crypt and sanctuary was also improved and expanded in the same year. Air-conditioning was installed in 2008. The Msgr. Fidelis Limcaco Hall is right beside the church and hosts concerts, receptions, and weekend markets. On the second floor of the Msgr. Fidelis Limcaco Hall are the Pastoral Offices of the Diocese of Novaliches.

Address
Regalado Avenue corner Omega Street, Barangay Fairview, Quezon City 1118

Pastors 
Below is the list of parish priests. Except for Msgr. Limcaco, the parish priests serve also as cathedral rectors.

Resources
The 2008–2009 Catholic Directory of the Philippines (published by Claretian Publications for the Catholic Bishops' Conference of the Philippines, June 2008)

Roman Catholic churches in Quezon City
Roman Catholic cathedrals in the Philippines
Year of establishment missing